1 Special Service Battalion (usually abbreviated to ) is an armoured regiment of the South African Army and only one of two such in its regular force. The Regiment is based at Tempe near Bloemfontein.

History

Following World War II, the Special Service Battalion was re-organised into 2 battalions - 1 Special Service Battalion and 1 South African Infantry Battalion.

When the South African Armoured Corps was thus officially proclaimed in 1946 and Special Service Battalion was included in the corps as the only full-time unit, its symbols and colours were incorporated.

1 SSB also took part in the South African Border War, serving in South-West Africa and Angola.

More recently, the unit also took part in Operation Boleas, which was a South African intervention in its neighbouring country of Lesotho in 1998.

1 SSB had a sister unit for a number of years in the post-World War II era, designated 2 Special Service Battalion, which was based in the town of Zeerust. This unit has now been disbanded.

1 SSB also detached squadrons to various battlegroups in the South West African campaign

Equipment

pre 1995

Current
The regiment is equipped primarily with Ratel infantry fighting vehicles and Rooikat armoured cars.

Future
Under Project Hoefyster, the SANDF will eventually replace the Ratel family of vehicles with the Badger system.
Five versions are contemplated of which two are earmarked for 1 SSB:

Missile (turreted Denel ZT3 Ingwe)
Fire Support (turreted  cannon, but with more ammunition than the section vehicle)

Regimental symbols

The cap badge is a spray of three protea flowers, bound by a ribbon bearing the initials and motto.
Regimental motto:  (English: Unity is Strength)
Regimental communications icon :  
Regimental deployment strength : 1,000 soldiers
Regimental honour roll : Soldiers who died during active combat duty and soldiers who died during training.
Regimental traditional contact meeting :  , once a year''

Previous Dress Insignia

Current Dress Insignia

Leadership

Alliances
  - 1st The Queen's Dragoon Guards

Battle honours

Future
This unit will together with 1 SA Tank Regiment form the Armoured Brigade of the new Mechanized Division to be formed under Army vision 2020.

See also
South African Armoured Corps

Notes

References

External links
 
 
 
 

Armoured regiments of South Africa
Military units and formations established in 1933
Military units and formations in Bloemfontein